Federal elections were held in Switzerland on 30 October 1955. The Social Democratic Party emerged as the largest party in the National Council, winning 53 of the 196 seats.

Results

National Council

By constituency

Council of the States
In several cantons the members of the Council of the States were chosen by the cantonal parliaments.

References

Switzerland
1955 in Switzerland
Federal elections in Switzerland
Federal
Swiss